All American Made is the second studio album by American country musician Margo Price. The album was released on October 20, 2017, by Third Man Records. In November 2017, the album debuted at number 89 on the Billboard 200. The album reached #1 in the Official Country Artists Chart in its third week of release in the UK.

In interviews for the album's release, Price noted the influence of Tom Petty on her songwriting. She dedicated the album to him following his death in early October 2017.

Price promoted the album with the Nowhere Fast tour that started in September 2017 and  concluded in March 2018.

Critical reception

All American Made received positive reviews from professional music critics, and it has been given a rating of 82 on Metacritic based on 14 reviews, indicating "universal acclaim".

Stephen Thomas Erlewine of AllMusic wrote that in a shift from the personal vignettes of her debut album, Price does not disguise her liberal politics in this album, and she also broadens her musical range "drawing an expansive portrait of American roots music, one that touches on R&B, Tex-Mex, girl group pop, spacy indie rock, and even Glen Campbell's trippiest moments", which are "unified by a musical and lyrical aesthetic that views American life not only as a continuum, but a place where the past and present, rural and urban are in constant dialogue." Leonie Cooper of NME noted that it is an album that harks back to the country genre's more authentic beginnings, and that by "adding a decent dose of 2017 into her classic sound, Price creates something truly great." Jonathan Bernstein of Rolling Stone compares Price's album to the best work of the seventies of Willie Nelson, who dueted with Price in "Learning to Lose", in that it is "both reverent and revolutionary, a traditional-minded statement that nevertheless blazes an urgent path forward."

Accolades

Commercial performance
The album debuted at No. 89 on Billboard 200, No. 12 on Top Country Albums and No. 4 on Americana/Folk Albums, with 7,000 copies sold. The album has sold 33,700 copies in the United States as of February 2019.

Track listing

Personnel
Album Band
Margo Price - vocals, percussion (1, 3, 5, 7, 11), acoustic guitar (4, 7, 9, 12), nylon string guitar (5), harmonies (5, 7, 8, 9)
Jeremy Ivey - acoustic guitar, electric guitar, bass (5), harmonica (9, 10), harmonies (9)
Dillon Napier - drums
Kevin Black - bass
Micah Hulscher - piano (1, 2, 4, 6, 8, 9), Mellotron (6, 9), synthesizer (6, 7), Wurlitzer (7, 10), organ (3), accordion (5)
Luke Schneider - pedal steel, dobro (5)
Jamie Davis - electric guitar, acoustic guitar (10)

Additional Musicians
Alex Muñoz - baritone guitar (6), electric guitar (11, 12), percussion (10), e-bow (11)
Josh Hedley - fiddle (2, 8, 11), harmonies (2, 11)
Ashley Wilcoxson & Erin Rae - background vocals (7, 8)
Lester Snell - string arrangement (3, 4)
Willie Nelson - vocals and "trigger" (4)
Mickey Raphael - harmonica (4)
Cory Younts - mandolin (5)
The McCrary Sisters - background vocals (10)
Matt Ross-Spang - Moog synthesizer (12)
The East Nashville Orphan Choir - background vocals (12)

Charts

References

External links
 
 

2017 albums
Margo Price albums
Third Man Records albums
Albums produced by Matt Ross-Spang